Centre Democrats  may refer to:
Active parties
Centre Democrats (Sweden)
Union of Christian and Centre Democrats (Italy)

Former parties
Centre Democrats (Denmark)
Centre Democrats (Netherlands)
Centre Democrats (San Marino)